Metzger's Tavern is a historic bar, restaurant and package liquor store in the east side of Henderson, Kentucky. It is the oldest continuously operating tavern in the state of Kentucky. In 2010, Metzger's Tavern was named one of Huffington Post's top 25 dive bars in the United States.

History

Metzger's Tavern opened in 1887 on Powell Street, drawing clientele from the Audubon neighborhood, a working class community of mill workers. It started out as either The Swing Door Saloon or Hosbach's - accounts vary. John Albert Metzger acquired the business in 1945 and it became Metzger's Market; it became Metzger's Tavern in 1962, when it was operated by John's son, Don Metzger, and his business partner, Joe Tigue.

Women did not enter Metzger's Tavern until the 1990s; this was a custom rather than any posted rule or policy. In the 1990s, women began joining co-workers for lunch, despite the lack of a women's restroom. There is still just one bathroom at the tavern, with two stand-up urinals and a door on the toilet cubicle.

Various Kentucky celebrities have visited the tavern, including then University of Kentucky basketball coach Rick Pitino and Kentucky governor Paul Patton.

Today

In 2006, Metzger's Tavern was purchased by Steve Watkins. As of 2016, he is looking to partner with someone who will then take over the business.

Metzger's best loved food is bean soup and chili, both with a side of oyster crackers, hamburgers, and fried bologna in eggs.

See also

Tootsie's Orchid Lounge
Threadgill's Tavern
Armadillo World Headquarters
James Brown House
Bridge Cafe
Max's Kansas City
Sloppy Joe's

References

Buildings and structures in Henderson County, Kentucky
Tourist attractions in Henderson County, Kentucky
1887 establishments in Kentucky
Drinking establishments in Kentucky
Henderson, Kentucky
Taverns in the United States